The Jan Pier House is a historic home located at Rhinebeck, Dutchess County, New York. The farmhouse was built about 1761 and remodeled about 1881 in a Second Empire style. It is a one- to two story, asymmetrical stone building built into a hillside. It features a Mansard roof sheathed in polychrome slate.  Also on the property are two contributing barns, a smoke house, wellhouse / well, and a cistern.

It was added to the National Register of Historic Places in 1987.

See also

National Register of Historic Places listings in Rhinebeck, New York

References

Houses on the National Register of Historic Places in New York (state)
Second Empire architecture in New York (state)
Houses completed in 1761
Houses in Rhinebeck, New York
National Register of Historic Places in Dutchess County, New York